The Wisconsin Veterans' Home, in King Wisconsin, is an old soldiers' home in Waupaca County, Wisconsin on the scenic Chain O' Lakes, Wisconsin.

The American Civil War saw significant advances in battlefield medicine. The lower mortality rate of injured soldiers led to the sentiment that the United States should provide care for its surviving injured veterans. The city of Waupaca purchased the land and buildings of the defunct Greenwood Park Hotel and donated the grounds to the Grand Army of the Republic (GAR) for the site of a veterans' home.

Civil War physician and GAR member Dr. Frederick Marden was chosen to head a five-member committee to organize a Wisconsin veterans' home. Among Dr. Marden's innovative ideas put into action was the practice of allowing wives and widows of veterans to live at the home, as well as the idea of allowing members to live semi-independently in cottages.  Marden died on September 24, 1887, a year before the site began operation on August 18, 1888.

It is one of the largest veterans home facilities in the country with a staff of nearly 1,000 workers and includes many self-contained community services, including its own fire department.

Historic Buildings

There are five U.S. Registered Historic Places in King Veterans Home: Commandant's Residence Home, Halfway House (King, Wisconsin), Old Hospital, Veterans Cottages Historic District, and Veterans Home Chapel.

Controversy

In 2016 controversy erupted over the quality of care delivered at the home, chronic staffing shortages and the practice by the state government of redirecting millions of dollars of federal government funding intended for King into other veterans' programs.

See also

Jonathan Letterman

References

External links
Wisconsin Department of Veterans' Affairs

Veterans' facilities
Old soldiers' homes in the United States
Buildings and structures in Waupaca County, Wisconsin
National Register of Historic Places in Waupaca County, Wisconsin